Laurel Hill Plantation may refer to:

 Laurel Hill Plantation (South Carolina), a plantation in Beaufort County, South Carolina
 Laurel Hill Plantation (Adams County, Mississippi)
 Laurel Hill Plantation (Jefferson County, Mississippi)

See also
 Laurel Hill (disambiguation)